Academy for Classical Education is a charter school in Macon, Georgia, that was originally part of the Bibb County School District. The school serves students in kindergarten to 12th grade. The student body is about 70 percent white, 16 percent African American and 8 percent Asian while Macon itself is about 70 percent African American and 25 percent white. It is highly ranked and in 2020 it was designated a National Blue Ribbon School by the United States Department of Education.

The school was established in 2014 and in 2019 it separated from local school district oversight to become a State Commissioned Charter School. While this led to improvements in budget and curriculum, it also  led to changes in admission and eligibility. In 2021, U.S. News recognized it as one of the best charter schools in the country.

References

External links 

 Official website

Schools in Bibb County, Georgia
Education in Georgia (U.S. state)